Afro-Dominican may refer to:
 Afro-Dominican (Dominican Republic) 
 Afro-Dominican (Dominica)